BR-324 is a federal highway in the Northeast Region of Brazil. The 1270.9 km road goes from Balsas, Maranhão, across the states of Piauí and Bahia to the Bahian state capital, Salvador.

References

Federal highways in Brazil